The women's team foil was one of eight fencing events on the fencing at the 1964 Summer Olympics programme. It was the second appearance of the event. The competition was held from October 16 – 17 1964. 47 fencers from 10 nations competed.

Medalists

Results

Round 1

Ties between teams were broken by individual victories (in parentheses), then by touches received.

Championship rounds

Rosters

Australia
 Jan Redman
 Johanna Winter
 Val Winter
 Janet Hopner
 Ulrike Winter

France
 Catherine Rousselet-Ceretti
 Marie-Chantal Depetris-Demaille
 Brigitte Gapais-Dumont
 Annick Level
 Colette Revenu

Germany
 Helga Mees
 Heidi Schmid
 Romy Weiß-Scherberger
 Gundi Theuerkauff

Great Britain
 Shirley Netherway
 Theresa Offredy
 Janet Bewley-Cathie-Wardell-Yerburgh
 Mary Watts-Tobin

Hungary
 Ildikó Ságiné Ujlakyné Rejtő
 Lídia Sákovicsné Dömölky
 Katalin Nagyné Juhász
 Judit Ágoston-Mendelényi
 Paula Marosi

Italy
 Antonella Ragno-Lonzi
 Giovanna Masciotta
 Irene Camber-Corno
 Natalina Sanguinetti
 Bruna Colombetti-Peroncini

Japan
 Yoshie Komori
 Tamiko Yasui
 Tomoko Owada
 Yoshie Takeuchi

Romania
 Olga Orban-Szabo
 Ileana Gyulai-Drîmbă-Jenei
 Ana Derșidan-Ene-Pascu
 Maria Vicol
 Ecaterina Stahl-Iencic

Soviet Union
 Valentina Rastvorova
 Tatyana Petrenko-Samusenko
 Lyudmila Shishova
 Valentina Prudskova
 Galina Gorokhova

United States
 Anne Drungis
 Jan York-Romary
 Denise O'Connor
 Harriet King
 Tommy Angell

References

Sources
 

Fencing at the 1964 Summer Olympics
Olymp
Fen